The International Mineralogical Association (IMA) is the international group that recognises new minerals and new mineral names. However, minerals discovered before 1959 did not go through the official naming procedure although some minerals published previously have been either confirmed or discredited since that date.

 Abbreviations:
"*" – discredited (IMA/CNMNC status).
"?" – questionable/doubtful (IMA/CNMNC, mindat.org or mineralienatlas.de status).
N – published without approval of the IMA/CNMNC.
I – intermediate member of a solid-solution series.
H – hypothetical mineral (synthetic, anthropogenic, etc.)
ch – incomplete description, hypothetical solid solution end member. 
group  – a name used to designate a group of species, sometimes only a mineral group name.
no – no link available.
red. – redefinition of ...
Y: 1NNN – year of publication.
Y: old – known before publications were available.


List of main synonyms 
Mainly renamed minerals and synonyms used by the Handbook of Mineralogy.

A 
A
Andorite IV: Quatrandorite; arrojadite-(BaFe): sigismundite;

B 
B
Boldyrevite: UM1941-01-F:AlCaHMgNa; Britholite-(Ce): Lessingite-(Ce)

C 
C
Chrysotile: Bostonite, Cyphoîte, Karystiolite, Krysolith, Kuphoite, Kupholite, Lefkasbestos, Picrosmine, Pikrosmin, Schweizerite, Ishkildite (var.);

D–E 
D
E
Epidote-(Pb): Hancockite;

F–G 
F
Fraipontite: Zinalsite; Ferro-Ferritschermakite: Ferri-Ferrotschermakite;
G
Gagarinite-(Ce): Zajacite-(Ce)

H–J 
H
Helvine: helvite; hinsdalite: orpheite; hydrokenoelsmoreite: alumotungstite, ferritungstite; hisingerite: sturtite;
I

J
Johnbaumite-M: fermorite, Jadeite;

K–L 
K
Karpatite: pendletonite (CNMMN, 1971), carpathite and coronene
L
Litidionite: lithidionite

M 
M
Manganohörnesite: manganese-hörnesite

N-O 
N
Natrozippeite: sodium-zippeite; natroboltwoodite: sodium-boltwoodite;
O
Osmium: iridosmine (var.);

P–R 
P
Pyrosmalite-Fe: Ferropyrosmalite
Q
Qingheiite: Qinghelite; Qitianlingite: Qitianglinite; Quartz: Azetulite, Azeztulite, Dragonite, Konilite, Lodolite, Quartz-alpha, Quertz; Quartz varieties: Agate, Amberine, Amethyst, Ametrine, Apricotine, Aventurine, Azurchalcedony, Basanite, Bayate, Beekite, Binghamite, Bloodstone, Buhrstone, Carnelian, Chalcedony, Chert, Chrysojasper, Citrine, Cotterite, Creolite, Cubosilicite, Dallasite, Damsonite, Darlingite, Diackethyst, Eisenkiesel, El Doradoite, Flint, Haytorite, Herbeckite, Irnimite, Jasper, Kinradite, Myrickite, Onyx, Pastelite, Prase, Prasiolite, Quartzine, Quetzalitztli, Ribbonstone, Sard, Sardonyx, Schwimmstein, Seftonite
R
Rutile: Cajuelite, Crispite, Dicksbergite, Edisonite, Gallitzinite, Paraedrite, Rutilite, Titankalk, Titanschorl; Rutile varieties: Ilmenorutile, Lusterite, Nigrine, Struverite; Römerite: Bückingite, Louderbackite, Roemerite;

S 
S
Stibiconite: hydroroméite; smolyaninovite: smolianinovite; sofiite: sophiite;

T 
T
Tadzhikite-(Ce): Tadzhikite-(Y); tantalite-(Fe): ferrotantalite; tantalite-(Mn): manganotantalite

U–Z 
U
Uzonite: Usonite;
V
Veatchite-p: P-Veatchite;
W

X
Xanthoconite: Rittingerite, Xanthocone; Xonotlite: Calcium-Pectolite, Eakleite, Xenotlite, Xonaltite, Xonolite
Y
Yttrotungstite-(Ce): Cerotungstite-(Ce)
Z

Mineral varieties 
Mainly minerals varieties used by the Handbook of Mineralogy.

Iridosmine*, an osmium variety, 01.AF.05   
Plagioclase solid solution series:
An0: albite; An20: oligoclase; An40: andesine; An60: labradorite; An80: bytownite; An100: anorthite
Oligoclase, albite variety, 09.FA.35   
Andesine, albite variety, 09.FA.35   
Labradorite, anorthite variety, 09.FA.35   
Bytownite, anorthite variety, 09.FA.35   
Ilmenorutile, a rutile variety, 04.DB.05   
Incaite*, a franckeite variety, 02.HF.25b   
Kamacite, a native iron variety, 01.AE.05   
Kerolite* (discredited 1979), a Ni-bearing variety of talc (?), 09.EC.05,   [no]
Lewistonite* (discredited 1978), a carbonate-rich variety of fluorapatite, 08.BN.05   [no]
Metaberyllite* (Y: 1973, discredited 2006), a variety of beryllite, 09.AE.05,   [no]
Potosiite*, a franckeite variety, 02.HF.25b   
Sakharovaite* (Y: 1956, discredited 2006), a Bi-bearing variety of jamesonite, 02.HB.15,   
Struverite*, a rutile variety, 04.DB.05

Doubtful procedures

Unnamed minerals, controversial discreditations 

Wolframoixiolite, a W-bearing variety of ixiolite, 04.DB.25; possibly a separate species.
Scandian ixiolite (of von Knorring)N, a Nb-bearing variety of ixiolite, 04.DB.25; possibly a separate species.
Scandian ixiolite (of Bergstol)N, a Sc-bearing variety of ixiolite, 04.DB.25; possibly a separate species.
Ktenasite (Y: 1950) 07.DD.20, possibly a mineral group, under review (Leverett et al., 2009–2011).
Unnamed (Zn-analogue of Ktenasite)N.
Unnamed (Co-analogue of Ktenasite)N.
Mg- or Cd-bearing varieties are also known.
Loparite-(Ce) (Y: 1923) 04.CC.35, possibly a mineral group
Mitchell R H, Burns P C, Chakhmouradian A R (2000) The crystal structures of loparite-(Ce), The Canadian Mineralogist 38, 145-152.
Zubkova, N. V., Arakcheeva, A. V., Pushcharovskii, D. Y., Semenov, E. I., & Atencio, D. (2000). Crystal structure of loparite. Crystallography Reports, 45(2), 210-214.
Calciogadolinite-Y? (Y: 1938) might be a calcian gadolinite.
 ClinotyroliteN (monoclinic), both minerals might belong to a mineral group since tyrolite was shown to be monoclinic (pseudo-orthorhombic).
 Yttromicrolite-(Y) within the framework of nomenclature of Hogarth (1977): discreditation was not made by proper way (in the course of defamation of Crook, 1982).
 Pimelite* (Y: 1800, 1938) a nickel dominant smectite, is under review. Associations: nickel-bearing talc, yellow green nickeloan nontronite, red brown hematite stained nontronite, bright white montmorillonite.
 Tetranatrolite (discredited in 1999): might be identical to gonnardite, discreditation procedure apparently done without actually working on the type specimen or on any identified tetranatrolite itself.
 Yftisite-(Y) (discredited in 1987): but apparently the cell parameters are known (Balko & Bakakin, 1975).
 Buserite (IMA1970-024): dehydrates to birnessite, known synthetic compound.
 Zincobotryogen: it is discredited (IMA1967 s.p.) but its crystal structure has been solved (space group 14).
 Strontioborite: it is discredited (IMA1962 s.p.) but its crystal structure has been solved (space group 4).
 Aguilarite (Y: 1944, Ag4SeS, 2.BA.55): it might be two solid solution series, a monoclinic ‘acanthite-like’ series (from Ag2S - Ag2S0.4Se0.6), and an orthorhombic ‘naumannite-like’ series (from Ag2S0.3Se0.7 - Ag2Se).

Controversial chemical formulas (IMA Master List) 
(and/or possible "analytical" artifacts)
Kobeite-Y (Y: 1950) 04.DG.05, the original analytical determinations contain between 14.91% and 17.08% ZrO2 with only 1.99% and 1.59% SiO2 respectively. The chemical formula doesn't contain Zr.
Pavel Kartashov: 
If no Zr and U>Th then euxenite group, polycrase 
If no Zr and U<Th then aeschynite group, priorite, blomastrandin.
Divalent sulfide. Mackinawite (Y: 1963) 02.CC.25 (IMA formula: ), sulfide anion (atoms per formula unit, apfu) might be too low due to analytical losses.
Pseudo monovalent mercury, mindat.org changed the chemical formulas: there is mercury(II) and (dimercury) [Hg-Hg] now.
Notes:
Claraite (IMA2016-L, IMA1981-023) 05.DA.30 (IMA formula: Cu2+3CO3(OH)4·4H2O), but after U. Kolitsch it has essential As and S.
Kolitsch, U. & Brandstätter, F. (2012): 1743) Baryt, Chalkophyllit und Clarait vom Pengelstein bei Kitzbühel, Tirol. P. 149. in Niedermayr, G. et al. (2012): Neue Mineralfunde aus Österreich LX. Carinthia II, 202./122., 123-180.
Putz, H., Lechner, A. & Poeverlein, R. (2012): Erythrin und Clarait vom Pichlerstollen am Silberberg bei Rattenberg, Nordtirol. Lapis, 37 (1), 47-52; 62.
New chemical formula: .
Cosalite (Y: 1868) 02.JB.10 (IMA formula: Pb2Bi2S5). It might have copper as essential constituent (AM Clark, MH Hey (1993) Hey's mineral index: mineral species, varieties and synonyms),. 
The general structural formula for cosalite can be expressed as: CuAgPbBiS20.
Mayenite (IMA2013-C, IMA1963-016): it can not be found in nature. Mayenite (stabilized by moisture) can be found in cement industry chemistry. Chlormayenite can be found in nature.

Suspended (IMA status) 
(IMA2000-026) : IMA approval status is suspended, but it was incorrectly stated as approved in Grice, J.D. & Ferraris, G. (2001).
(IMA1989-012), zhangpeishanite (of Shen), unnamed (cordylite-like.

Grandfathered (IMA valid species) 
Chrysocolla? (Theophrastus, 315 BC), it's suggested that it is mixture of spertiniite (Cu(OH)2) and chalcedony or opal, it has similarities with copper-bearing allophane.
Loranskite-(Y) (Y: 1899) it might be a fictional mineral, the type material is probably a mixture of euxenite and zircon.

Rejected or discredited minerals 

Possibly non-valid: bismutostibiconite, lazurite and lonsdaleite.
ArsenosulvaniteD   
Probably colusite.
Carbonate-apatites:
Carbonate-rich fluorapatite (discredited 2008) 08.BN.05   
Carbonate-rich hydroxylapatite (discredited 2008) 08.BN.05   
ChelyabinskiteHQD (Y: 1988, rejected 1986) 07.DG.45   [no] 
Possibly identical to thaumasite.
Churchite-(Nd)D (Y: 1983, IMA1987 s.p., IMA2015-C) 08.CJ.50   [no]
DieneriteD (Y: 1944, discredited 2006) 02.??    
It was reported as microinclusions in a sobolevite grain, Norilsk deposit (2006).
Ferrorhodsite (spinel, linnaeite: IMA1996-047, discredited 2018) 02.DA.05   [no]
Fluorarrojadite-(BaNa)N 08.BF.?? (IMA2005 s.p., red.) [no]  [no]
FoshallasiteD   
HeliophylliteD (Y: 1888) 03.DC.65   
ImgreiteD (discredited 1968)   [no]
NatrofairchilditeD   
Probably nyerereite.
Pseudo-autuniteD (Y: 1965)   [no]
SchirmeriteD (Y: 1874, redefined and discredited 2008) 02.JB.40d     
SpodiophylliteD (IMA1998 s.p.) 
Possibly a mica related to tainiolite: Canadian Mineralogist 36 (1998), 905.
StrontioboriteD (Y: 1960) 06.FC.10   
VondecheniteD (IMA2016-065) 03. 
WellsiteD   [no]
Either barian phillipsite-Ca or calcian harmotome.
Zhonghuacerite-(Ce)D (Y: 1982) 05.BD.10   [no] 
Note: probably huanghoite-(Ce) or kukharenkoite-(Ce).

Errors and synonyms 
AnkangiteD (IMA1986-026) 04.DK.05   
Synonym of mannardite (discredited in 2012: IMA 2011-F).
AniyunwiyaiteD (IMA2018-054) 08.  [no] [no]
Synonym of kingsmountite.
AnniviteD (tetrahedrite: IMA2018-K, IMA2008 s.p., 1854) 02.
BasaluminiteD   
Synonym of felsőbányaite.
BobdownsiteD (IMA2008-037, discredited 2017) 08.AC.45   [no]
Synonym of merrillite.
BrabantiteD (Y: 1981, discredited 2007)   
Synonym of cheralite.
BrearleyiteD (IMA2013-C, IMA2010-062) 04.CC.20  [no] [no]
Synonym of chlormayenite.
CadmoxiteD (IMA2012-037) 04.AB.??  [no] [no] (IUPAC: Cadmium oxide)
The type material is uraninite: CNMNC Newsletter No. 17, October 2013
ClinotyroliteD (Y: 1980) 8.DM.10  [no] 
Synonym of tangdanite.
CobaltogordaiteD (IMA2015-K, IMA2014-043) 07.D?.  [no] [no]
Thérèsemagnanite got redefined, same as thérèsemagnanite now.
CoeruleolactiteD (n/a)  [no] 
Turquoise group, discredited 2006.
Chromo-alumino-povondraite (IMA2009-088, IMA2013-089 with new type material) 09.CK.05  [no] [no]
Former type material is chromdravite: CNMNC Newsletter No. 16, August 2013; Mineralogical Magazine, 77 (2013), 2695-2709.
DiomigniteD (IMA2015-H, IMA1984-058a) 06.DD.05   
Misidentification of zabuyelite.
EleonoriteD (beraunite: IMA2015-003) 8.0  [no] [no]
Synonym of beraunite.
EndelliteD   [no]
Halloysite-10Å
FejeriteD (IMA2012-014, IMA2015-L) 03.??.  [no] [no]
Claringbullite got redefined, same as claringbullite now.
FerrotelluriteD (Y: 1877) 07.AB.10  [no] [no] Note: type material is keystoneite.
Fluorthalénite-(Y) (IMA2014-D, IMA1994-022) 09.BJ.20   [no]
Thalénite-(Y) got redefined, same as thalénite-(Y) now.
FreibergiteD (tetrahedrite: IMA2018-K, 1853) 02.GB.05 
Lesukite (IMA2018-H, IMA1996-004) 03.BD.10   [no] 
It is cadwaladerite.
MarianoiteD (discredited 2020, IMA2005-005a) 9.BE.17   
It is wöhlerite.
OrpheiteD 
Identical to hinsdalite.
Potassicmendeleevite-(Ce) (IMA2009-093, not approved) 09.??. 
SteedeiteD (IMA2010-049, approval withdrawn 2011) 09.CA.15  [no] [no]
Synonym of catapleiite.
SurkhobiteD (IMA2007-A, IMA2006-E, IMA2002-037 Rd) 9.BE.67  [no] 
Synonym of perraultite

Non minerals 
AshaniteD  [no] 
Probably a mixture of several minerals including ixiolite, samarskite-(Y) and uranmicrolite.
BoldyreviteD (IMA2006-C, Y: 1941) 03.CF.10   [no] 
It might be impure hydrokenoralstonite or gearksutite.
BursaiteD  [no] 
A mixture of two sulphosalts.
GirditeD (IMA2016-F, IMA1979-006) 04.JL.30   
Two or more phases.
HorsforditeD (discredited IMA2006 s.p.)  [no] 
Smelter product, it has three phases.
IodineD (Y: 1897, IMA2015-D) 01.AA.15  [no] [no]
Type specimen description states that it is only a vapour production.
ParajamesoniteD (discredited 2007)   
Either jamesonite or a mixture of jamesonite and argentian tetrahedrite (freibergite) and/or ramdohrite.
JeromiteD   
An amorphous As-S-Se phase of variable composition.
MerumiteD 
A mixture of mainly eskolaite and bracewellite, grimaldiite, guyanaite and mcconnellite.
NatromontebrasiteD (IMA2005-E)   
A mixture of amblygonite, lacroixite and wardite. 
PartziteD (IMA2016-B, IMA2013 s.p., 1867) 04.??.   
A mixture of several phases, which include a member of the plumboroméite group and a chrysocolla-like amorphous phase.
PercyliteD   [no]
Mixture of boleite und pseudoboleite.
SpodiositeD (IMA2003-B, Y: 1872)   [no]
A mixture of calcite, fluorapatite, serpentine group. 
ThorogummiteD (IMA2014-B, Y: 1889) 09.AD.30   
 Heterogeneous mixture of secondary, non-crystalline minerals, after the alteration, hydration, or metamictization of thorite.
Tombarthite-(Y)D (IMA2016-K, IMA1967-031) 09.AD.35    
Many phases.
UhligiteD (IMA2006-C) 04.XX.??    
Possibly impure perovskite or zirkelite.

Discredited mineral varieties 
AnatacamiteD (IMA2015-A, IMA2009-042) 03.DA.10d  [no] [no]
Twinned clinoatacamite.
BakeriteD (IMA2016-A, Y: 1903) 09.AJ.20   
Gadolinite supergroup, datolite group was reviewed.
Cheralite-(Ce)D  [no]  
Ca-rich monazite-(Ce).
FupingqiuiteD (IMA2016-087) 08.  [no] [no]
Varulite variety.
HibschiteD (Y: 1906, IMA1983-B, voting proposal IMA2011-D) 09.AD.25   
A variety of grossular.
HydrohetaeroliteD (Y: 1928, 2019 s.p.) 04.BB.10   
A variety of hetaerolite.
Luinaite-(OH)D (distorted tourmaline: IMA2009-046, IMA21-L) 9.CK.05  [no] [no]
A variety of schorl
MagniotripliteD (IMA2003-C)  [no] 
A variety of wagnerite.
MatraiteD (IMA2006-C)   
A densely twinned columnar variety of sphalerite.
ParaspurriteD (IMA2009-B)   
Polysynthetically microtwinned spurrite.
TellurocanfielditeD (IMA2012-013, approval withdrawn) 
 Te-rich canfieldite.
ViséiteD   
Si-bearing crandallite.

Discredited polytypes 
See polytype section

Groups and pairs 
ZinnwalditeG (Y: 1845) 09.EC.20   
A series between siderophyllite and polylithionite.
HydrophiliteD (discredited IMA2006 s.p.)   
Its description is incomplete; it can be antarcticite as well as sinjarite.

Amphibole dump 
Discredited, renamed and/or hypothetical amphiboles
AluminobarroisiteD (Y: 1978) 09.DE.20   [no]
Barroisite since 2012.
Alumino-magnesiotaramiteN (IMA2006-024) 09.DE.20 
It isn't an IMA approved mineral.
AluminotschermakiteD (Y: 1978) 09.DE.10  [no] [no]
Tschermakite since 2012.
Cannilloitech (Y: 1997) 09.DE.10  [no] [no] (Ca3(Mg4Al)(Si5Al3)O22(OH)2)
Clinoferroholmquistitech (Y: 1997) 09.DE.05   [no]
Clinoholmquistite   
Ferribarroisitech (Y: 1997, 2012) 09.D?  [no] [no]
Ferric-nybøitech (Y: 1997) 09.DE.25  [no] [no]
Ferri-ferrobarroisite (Y: 1918) 09.DE.20   [no]
Ferri-ferrotschermakite (Y: 1918) 09.D?.   [no]
Ferrikaersutite (IMA2011-035) 09.??  [no] [no]
Ferri-magnesiotaramite (Y: 1997) 09.DE.20   [no]
Ferritschermakitech (Y: 1949) 09.DE.10   [no]
Ferrobarroisitech (Y: 1978) 09.DE.20   
Ferro-eckermannitech (Y: 1964) 09.DE.25   [no]
Ferrokaersutitech (Y: 1978) 09.DE.15   
Ferroleakeitech (Y: 1997) 09.DE.25   [no]
Ferronybøitech (Y: 1997) 09.??  [no] [no]
Ferropedrizitech (Y: 2003) 09.DE.25  [no] [no]
Ferrowinchitech (Y: 1978) 09.DE.20   [no]
Leakeitech (IMA2012 s.p., IMA1991-028 Rd) 09.DE.25   
Magnesiosadanagaite (IMA2002-051) 09.DE.15   
Magnesiotaramite (Y: 1978) 09.DE.20   
Manganocummingtonitech (Y: 1997) 09.DE.05   [no] 
Manganogruneritech (Y: 1997) 09.DE.05    
Parvo-mangano-edenite (IMA2003-062) 09.DE.15   [no]
Parvo-manganotremolite (IMA2004-045) 09.DE.10   [no]
PedriziteH (Y: 2000) 09.DE.25  [no] [no]
PermanganogruneriteH (Y: 1997) 09.DE.05   [no]
Potassic-aluminosadanagaite (Y: 2003) 09.?? [no] [no] [no] 
Protomangano-ferro-anthophyllite (IMA1986-007) 09.DD.05   [no]
Sodicanthophyllite (Y: 1977) 09.DD.05   [no]
Sodic-ferri-clinoferroholmquistite (IMA1995-045) 09.DE.25   [no]
Sodic-ferro-anthophyllitech (Y: 1997) 09.DD.05   [no]
Sodic-ferrogedritech (Y: 1997) 09.DD.05   [no]
Sodic-ferropedrizitech (Y: 2003) 09.DE.25  [no] [no]
Sodicgedritech (Y: 1997) 09.DD.05   [no]
Sodicpedrizitech (Y: 2003) 09.DE.25  [no] [no]

Polytypes 

Based on Nickel (1993).

Synonyms, discredited polytypes 

Under construction
BarbertoniteD (discredited 2011)   
Polytype of stichtite.
ClinobaryliteD (IMA2013-E, IMA2002-015) 09.BB.15   [no] (IUPAC: Diberyllium barium sorosilicate, Si2O7)
Polytype barylite-1O.
ClinomimetiteD (Y: 1993) 08.BN.05   
Polytype mimetite-M (discredited 2010, IMA1990-043a).
Johnbaumite-MD   
Monoclinic polytype of johnbaumite.
Lavinskyite-2O (IMA2012-028) 09.D?  [no] [no] (Chemical formula: K(LiCu)Cu6(Si4O11)2(OH)4)
Lavinskyite-1M (liguriaite, IMA2014-035) 09.D?  [no] [no]
ManasseiteD (2012, 1941) 05.DA.45    (IUPAC: Hexamagnesium dialuminium carbonate hexadecahydroxyl tetrahydrate)
Polytype hydrotalcite-2H.
OrthochamositeD (Y: 1951) 09.EC.55  [no] [no] 
Possibly a polytype of chamosite. Its formal discreditation was forgotten. It was on the IMA Master List (October 2008). 
Quote: "the varietal names of brunsvigite, corundophilite, daphnite, delessite, diabantite, grovesite, kiimmererite, kotchubeite, leuchtenbergite, orthochamosite, pennine, pseudothuringite, pycnochlorite, ripidolite, sheridanite, talc-chlorite and thuringite should be discarded." 
ParabariomicroliteD (IMA2016-C, IMA1984-003) 04.FJ.20   
Polytype hydrokenomicrolite-3R.
SjögreniteD (discredited 2012, 1941) 05.DA.45    (IUPAC: Hexamagnesium diiron(III) carbonate hexadecahydroxyl tetrahydrate)
Polytype pyroaurite-2H.
 Balangeroite 9.DH.35 
 Polytypes: -2M and -1A.
 Bariopharmacosiderite 8.DK.10 
 Polytypes: -C and -Q.
 Barylite 9.BB.15 
 Polytypes: -1O and -2O.
 Berborite 6.AB.10
 Polytypes: -2H , -1T , -2T 
Cayalsite-(Y) (IMA2011-094) 9.??  [no] [no]
 Polytypes: -1M, -1O
 Chamosite 9.EC.55   
 Clinochamosite
 Orthochamosite   
 Chrysotile 9.ED.15   [none]
 Clinochrysotile   
 Orthochrysotile   
 Parachrysotile   
Clinotobermorite 9.DG.10 
Polytypes: -2M  and -1A .
Cualstibite (IMA1983-068) 4.FM.40  (IUPAC: Pentacopper dialuminium triantimony(III) dodecaoxy hydroxyl dodecahydrate)
Cualstibite-1M* (syn. cyanophyllite, IMA1980-065, IMA2012-B)   
Cualstibite-1T 
Dioskouriite (IMA2015-106) 
Polytypes: -2M, -2O
 Ericssonite (IMA1966-013) 9.BE.25 
 Ericssonite-2M
 Ericssonite-2O* (syn. orthoericssonite, IMA1970-005, IMA2010-F)   
 Gageite 9.DH.35 
 Polytypes: -1A and -2M.
 Gersdorffite (1986 s.p. Rd) 2.EB.25    (IUPAC: Nickel arsenide sulfide)
 Gersdorffite-P213 (Y: 1982, NiAsS)
 Gersdorffite-Pa3 (Y: 1845) 
 Gersdorffite-Pca21 (Y: 1982, NiAsS)
 Graphite 1.CB.05a
 Polytypes: -2H, -3R 
 Greenalite 9.ED.15
 Polytypes: -1A, -1M, -2M1, -2Å, -3R, -3Å 
 Hilgardite 6.ED.05   
 Hilgardite-1Tc   
 Hilgardite-3Tc   
 Hilgardite-4M   
 IlliteG   [none]
 Polytypes: -1M , Illite1Md , -2M 
 Ivanukite-Na
Ivanyukite-Na-C (IMA2007-041) (titanosilicate)   [no]
Ivanyukite-Na-T (Y: 2009) (titanosilicate)   [no]
 Kaolinite 9.ED.05   
 Dickite   
 Nacrite   
Khinite, broad sense 4.FD.30
Khinite-3T* (syn. parakhinite, 1978-036, IMA 2008-C)   
Khinite-4O (syn. khinite, strict sense; 1978-035, IMA 2008-C Rd)
 Lamprophyllite 9.BE.25
 Polytypes: -2M , -2O  
Moissanite 01.DA.-- ("carborundum (synthetic)")  (IUPAC: silicon carbide)
A large number of polytypes are known, the majority of moissanite samples are 6H and 15R polytypes.
Natroalunite (Y: 1902) 7.BC.10    (IUPAC: Sodium trialuminium disulfate hexahydroxyl)
Natroalunite-2c (IMA1980-095) 7.BC.10   
 Nechelyustovite 9.BE.55 
 Polytypes: -1M and -2M.
 Pearceite-Tac - Polybasite Series
 Pearceite-Tac 2.GB.15   
 Polybasite 2.GB.15   
 Polybasite-Tac   
Pearceite-T2ac   
Pearceite-M2a2b2c 
Polybasite-T2ac 
Polybasite-M2a2b2c 
Nomenclature change: antimonpearceite was replaced by polybasite-Tac, arsenpolybasite-221 by pearceite-T2ac, arsenpolybasite-222 by pearceite-M2a2b2c, polybasite-221 by polybasite-T2ac, and polybasite-222 by polybasite-M2a2b2c.  
Plombièrite 9.DG.08 
Polytypes: -4O  and -2M .
 Quintinite (IMA1992-028, IMA1998 s.p.) 5.DA.40   [none]
 Quintinite-2H  
 Quintinite-3T* (1992-029, 1998 s.p.) 
Veatchite 6.EC.15    
Veatchite-A (IMA1978-030)     
Veatchite-1M (Y: 1959, veatchite-p)    
Veatchite-2M (Y: 1938) 
Wagnerite (Y: 1821) 
Polytypes: -Ma2bc, -Ma3bc, -Ma5bc, -Ma7bc, -Ma9bc
 Wollastonite 9.DG.05 
Polytypes: -1A , -2M , -3A , -4A , -5A , -7A 
Wurtzite 2.CB.45 
Polytypes: -10H, -15R, -4H, -6H, -8H
Xonotlite 9.DG.35 
Polytypes: -Ma2bc, -Ma2b2c, -M2a2bc
Zaccagnaite 5.DA.45 
Polytypes: -2H, -3R
Zincowoodwardite 7.DD.35 
Polytypes: -1T, -3R
Zirconolite 4.DH.30 
Polytypes: -2M , -3O , -3T

Hydrous diuranyl di(RO4) family

Meta-autunite group 
Meta-autunite, 8.EB.10, tetragonal
Uramarsite, 8.EB.15, tetragonal

Natroautunite group 
Abernathyite, 8.EB.15, tetragonal
Chernikovite, 8.EB.15, tetragonal
Meta-ankoleite, 8.EB.15, tetragonal
Natrouranospinite, 8.EB.15, tetragonal
Trögerite, 8.EB.15, tetragonal
Uramphite, 8.EB.15, tetragonal

Carnotite family (partial) 
Carnotite, 4.HB.05, monoclinic
Margaritasite, 4.HB.05, monoclinic
Metavanuralite, 4.HB.20, triclinic
Sengierite, 4.HB.10, monoclinic
Strelkinite, 4.HB.30, orthorhombic
Tyuyamunite, 4.HB.25, orthorhombic
Vanuralite, 4.HB.20, monoclinic

Other hydrous families 

Przhevalskite (4H2O), 8.EB.10, orthorhombic
Metauramphite (6H2O), questionable mineral
Metauranocircite-I (6H2O), 8.EB.10, monoclinic
Lehnerite (8H2O), 8.EB.05, tetragonal
Metaheinrichite (8H2O), 8.EB.10, tetragonal
Metakahlerite (8H2O), 8.EB.10, triclinic
Metakirchheimerite (8H2O), 8.EB.10, triclinic
Metanováčekite (8H2O), 8.EB.10, tetragonal
Metarauchite (8H2O), 8.EB.05, triclinic
Metasaléeite (8H2O), 8.EB.10, tetragonal
Metatorbernite (8H2O), 8.EB.10, tetragonal
Metauranospinite (8H2O), 8.EB.10, tetragonal
Metazeunerite (8H2O), 8.EB.10, tetragonal
Threadgoldite (8H2O), 8.EB.20, monoclinic
Autunite (10-12H2O), 8.EB.05, orthorhombic
Bassetite ((H2O)10), 8.EB.10, monoclinic
Heinrichite (10H2O), 8.EB.05, monoclinic
Metalodèvite (10H2O), 8.EB.10, tetragonal
Nováčekite-II (10H2O), n.d., monoclinic
Rauchite (10H2O), 8.EB.05, triclinic
Saléeite ((H2O)10), 8.EB.05, monoclinic
Uranocircite-II (10H2O), n.d., tetragonal
Uranospinite (10H2O), 8.EB.05, tetragonal
Kahlerite (12H2O), 8.EB.10, monoclinic
Nováčekite-I (12H2O), 8.EB.05, triclinic
Torbernite (12H2O), 8.EB.05, tetragonal
Zeunerite (12H2O), 8.EB.05, tetragonal

Hydrotalcite supergroup 
The hydrotalcite supergroup might need another review.

Hydrotalcite group
DesautelsiteA (1978-016), chemical formula
Suggested: 
DroninoiteA (2008-003), chemical formula
Suggested: 
HydrotalciteG (Y: 1842), chemical formula
Suggested: 
IowaiteA (1967-002), chemical formula
Suggested: 
JamboriteQ (1971-037), chemical formula
Suggested: possibly 
MeixneriteA (1974-003), chemical formula
Suggested: 
PyroauriteRd (Y: 1865), chemical formula
Suggested: 
ReevesiteA (1966-025), chemical formula
Suggested: 
StichtiteRd (Y: 1910), chemical formula
Suggested: 
TakoviteA (Y: 1957, 1977 s.p.), chemical formula
Suggested: 
WoodalliteA (2000-042), chemical formula
Suggested: 

Quintinite group
CaresiteA (1992-030), chemical formula
Suggested: 
CharmariteA (1992-026), chemical formula
Suggested: 
ChlormagaluminiteA (1980-098), chemical formula
Suggested: 
ComblainiteA (1978-009), chemical formula
Suggested: 
QuintiniteA (1992-028), chemical formula
Suggested: 
ZaccagnaiteA (1997-019), chemical formula
Suggested: 

Fougèrite group
FougèriteRd (2003-057), chemical formula
Suggested: 
MössbaueriteA (2012-049), chemical formula
Suggested: 
TrébeurdeniteA (2012 s.p.), chemical formula
Suggested: 

Woodwardite group
HonessiteA (1962 s.p.), chemical formula
Suggested: (Ni_{1\!-\mathit{x}} Fe_{3\!+\mathit{x}} )(SO4)_{\mathit{x}/2}(OH)2.\mathit{n}H2O 
WoodwarditeG (Y: 1866), chemical formula
Suggested: (Cu_{1\!-\mathit{x}}Al_\mathit{x} )(SO4)_{\mathit{x}/2}(OH)2.\mathit{n}H2O 
ZincowoodwarditeA (1998-026), chemical formula
Suggested: (Zn_{1\!-\mathit{x}}Al_\mathit{x} )(SO4)_{\mathit{x}/2}(OH)2.\mathit{n}H2O 

Cualstibite group
CualstibiteRd (1983-068), chemical formula
Suggested: 
OmsiteA (2012-025), chemical formula
Suggested: 
ZincalstibiteA (1998-033), chemical formula
Suggested: 

Glaucocerinite group
CarrboyditeQ (1974-033), chemical formula
Suggested: (Ni_{1\!-\mathit{x}}Al_\mathit{x} )(SO4)_{\mathit{x}/2}(OH)2.\mathit{n}H2O 
GlaucoceriniteG (Y: 1932), chemical formula
Suggested: (Zn_{1\!-\mathit{x}}Al_\mathit{x} )(SO4)_{\mathit{x}/2}(OH)2.\mathit{n}H2O 
HydrohonessiteA (1980-037a), chemical formula
Suggested: (Ni_{1\!-\mathit{x}} Fe_{3\!+\mathit{x}} )(SO4)_{\mathit{x}/2}(OH)2.\mathit{n}H2O 
HydrowoodwarditeA (1996-038), chemical formula
Suggested: (Cu_{1\!-\mathit{x}}Al_\mathit{x} )(SO4)_{\mathit{x}/2}(OH)2.\mathit{n}H2O 
MountkeithiteA (1980-038), chemical formula
Suggested: (Mg_{1\!-\mathit{x}} Fe_{3\!+\mathit{x}} )(SO4)_{\mathit{x}/2}(OH)2.\mathit{n}H2O 
ZincaluminiteQ (Y: 1881), chemical formula
Suggested: (Zn_{1\!-\mathit{x}}Al_\mathit{x} )(SO4)_{\mathit{x}/2}(OH)2.\mathit{n}H2O 

Wermlandite group
KarchevskyiteA (2005-015a), chemical formula
Suggested: 
MotukoreaiteQ (1976-033), chemical formula
Suggested: , possibly more than one species
NatroglaucoceriniteQ (1995-025), chemical formula
Suggested: possibly 
NikischeriteA (2001-039), chemical formula
Suggested: 
ShigaiteA (1984-057), chemical formula
Suggested: 
WermlanditeA (1970-007), chemical formula
Suggested: 

Hydrocalumite group
HydrocalumiteG (Y: 1934), chemical formula
Suggested: , possibly multiple species
KuzeliteA (1996-053), chemical formula
Suggested:

See also 
 List of minerals recognized by the International Mineralogical Association

Further reading 

Subcommittee on zeolite minerals of the IMA/CNMNC
 
"Subcommittee on amphiboles of the IMA/CNMNC"

External links 
Mindat.org  (The Mineral Database)
Webmineral.com
Handbook of Mineralogy (Mineralogical Society of America)
New minerals recently approved by the IMA-CNMNC

References